Indianola is a ghost town located on Matagorda Bay in Calhoun County, Texas, United States. The community, once the county seat of Calhoun County, is a part of the Victoria, Texas, Metropolitan Statistical Area. In 1875, the city had a population of 5,000, but on September 15 of that year, a powerful hurricane struck, killing between 150 and 300 and almost entirely destroying the town. Indianola was rebuilt, only to be wiped out on August 19, 1886, by another intense hurricane, which was followed by a fire. Indianola was designated a Recorded Texas Historic Landmark in 1963, marker number 2642.

History

German immigration port of entry 
Prince Carl of Solms-Braunfels, representing the Adelsverein, selected Indian Point in December, 1844 as port of entry for the Verein colonists from Germany. Prince Solms renamed the port Carlshafen in honor of himself, Count Carl of Castell-Castell and Count Victor August of Leiningen-Westerburg-Alt-Leiningen whom Solms claimed had been christened Carl. Prince Solms' choice of Carlshafen and its inadequate accommodations as a port of entry, as well as the isolated route to New Braunfels, was to keep the Germans from interacting with any Americans. In February 1845 Henry Francis Fisher conspired with Dr. F. Schubbert to coerce incoming immigrants to sign legal documents disassociating themselves from the Verein and to join Schubbert's colony in Milam County.

In May 1846, Meusebach received a letter from Count Castell informing him 4,304 colonists were on their way to Texas. With no funds and no new settlements, the mass of emigrants were stalled at Carlshafen. Meusebach's requests to the Verein for more money, and his warnings at pending bankruptcy for the Verein, brought no results. As a last resort, Meusebach instructed D.H. Klaener to publish the plight in the German news media. Embarrassed by the publicity, the Verein established an inadequate $60,000 letter of credit. Meusebach had arranged with the Torrey Brothers for transporting the emigrants inland, but the United States hired the Torrey Brothers for use in the Mexican–American War. An epidemic of spinal meningitis broke out at Carlshafen and spread with the emigrants to New Braunfels and Fredericksburg.

Samuel Addition White and William M. Cook founded Indian Point, later Indianola, in August, 1846. This settlement developed along a corridor of beachfront for twenty-three blocks. In 1849, the town changed its name from Indian Point to Indianola. In 1852, Calhoun County selected Indianola as its county seat.
Some of these immigrants purchased land from Samuel White and established a settlement at Indian Point. The name of the settlement changed to Indianola in 1849 by combining the word Indian with ola, the Spanish word for "wave". The German immigrants continued to refer to the community as Carlshaven (Carl's Harbor) in honor of Prince Carl of Solms-Braunfels.

Post-German immigration years 

From its founding in 1846, Indianola served as a major port, and before the 1875 storm was second only to Galveston, Texas as Texas' primary port. Charles Morgan established Indianola as a port of call for his gulf coast steamship line in 1849.

The town incorporated in 1853. In 1856, the port received cargoes of camels, part of the United States Camel Corps experiment to replace horses and mules as the primary pack animal in the southwestern parts of the country.

During the American Civil War, Indianola was twice occupied by Union troops, in October 1862 and November 1863. During the second occupation, part of a Union infantry regiment moving from Indianola to Matagorda Island drowned in Matagorda Bay.

In 1869, the world's first mechanically-refrigerated shipment of beef left Indianola for New Orleans.

During World War II, the United States Army constructed an anti-aircraft firing range along the Indianola shoreline to train gunners and the facility was used primarily by military personnel from Camp Hulen, located outside of Palacios.

Impact of storms 
Having survived severe storms before, Indianola was almost totally destroyed on 16 September 1875. The New York Times reported in detail on the extensive loss of life and property. Even the lighthouses were swept away and the keepers, including Thomas H. Mayne and Edward Flick Jr. of the East Shoal Lighthouse, killed.

The town was rebuilt, but events were repeated in 1886. The destruction served as an abject lesson for many residents of Galveston, 100 miles up the Texas coast. However, their calls for a seawall to protect that city went unheeded, and Galveston nearly shared Indianola's fate when the Galveston Hurricane of 1900 struck the island.

A railroad was intended to connect the port of Indianola to San Antonio. After the two storms, discouraged investors abandoned the venture and made Galveston the port of choice. After Galveston's hurricane, shipping traffic recentered over time to inland Houston.

After the 1886 storm, the county seat was moved to Port Lavaca. On October 4, 1887, the post office in Indianola was permanently closed and the town declared "dead". Today, almost nothing remains of the original Indianola, as, due to storm erosion, most of the site of the city is now under water. A granite marker was placed on the shore at the nearest point to the Indianola courthouse, now 300 feet (about 90 meters) away in Matagorda Bay. It reads, "Calhoun County Courthouse. Edward Beaumont, Architect 1859. During the Storms of 1875 and 1886, precious lives were saved within its walls of shell, concrete, and lime. Abandoned 1886." The site is also home to a statue of René-Robert Cavelier, Sieur de La Salle.

Indianola is now the site of a small unincorporated fishing village.

Popular culture

In literature 
In Elizabeth Hand's novel Aestival Tide, a reconstructed Indianola is featured as the lowermost level of the central ziggurat in the dome city of Araboth.

In the novel Matagorda by author Louis L'Amour, much of the action took place in Indianola, Texas on the day it was destroyed by the 1875 hurricane. The courthouse, the site of which is now underwater out in the bay, was featured as the last refuge of the townspeople.

In Part I of Isaac's Storm, in the chapter "Galveston: An Absurd Delusion," Erik Larson describes the two storms that ravaged Indianola and the significance of these storms for Galveston, leading up to the Galveston storm of 1900. He notes: "At first, Galveston's leading men seemed to grasp the significance of the Indianola storms. Anyone who looked at a map could see that Galveston was even more vulnerable to destruction than Indianola. It had no picket of barrier islands to shelter it, no buffer of mainland prairie. The city faced the Gulf head-on." He further observes: "Six weeks after the second Indianola storm, a group of thirty prominent Galveston residents calling themselves the Progressive Association met and resolved to build a seawall", and "The city's Evening Tribune endorsed the plan". However, although "The state eventually did authorize a bond to pay for the work," the city's engineer E.M. Hartwick observed, "this was some months after the flood, and by then the attitude was, Oh, we'll never get another one--and they didn't build."

Larson criticizes meteorologist Isaac Cline (among others) for this failure. For example, Larson cites statements Cline published in the July 1891 Galveston News article, "West India Hurricanes":

Further, in Part III of Isaac's Storm, in a chapter titled "Ritter's Cafe: You Can't Frighten Me", Larson publishes the recollections of Mollie Cohen, whose impressions of the Galveston Storm of 1900 reminded her of the second Indianola hurricane:

In music 

Singer/songwriter Charlie Robison included a song titled "Indianola" on the 1998 album Life of the Party. The song begins from the perspective of a German immigrant approaching Indianola by sea and chronicling details of the narrator's family. The narrator and his cousin attempt to traverse the South to join the Union Army in the American Civil War, though they encounter Rebel resistance in Indianola. The next scene of the folk song briefly addresses the Wall Street Crash of 1929 in an indirect fashion, noting that little change occurred in their respective lives other than rust accumulating on wagon wheels. While this verse is brief in regards to words and time, it denotes a subtle and increasing disaffection in the American/Texan experience, adversely affected by seemingly non-relevant incidences. The storyline then progresses to World War II, introducing an internal struggle between the call of duty of the United States and its armed conflict with Germany, the ancestral point of origin of many Americans. The overall sentiment of the song begins as a story of new promises followed by a series of fictional, though personally carved facts, that illustrate a common experience for the individualist. Texas exemplifies a spirit that is not only uniquely a Texan story, but an American one, thrusting the individual against the external influence that would assume its right to assert its own values.

Singer/songwriter Brian Burns included the song "Indianola" on his 2004 album Heavy Weather. The lyrics chronicle the full life cycle of Indianola, with verses from the points of view of a personified Matagorda Bay, an immigrant who helped build the city (Johann), a worker who came to help "bury the lost souls who perished that day" (Isaac), and finally the songwriter himself visiting the site (Brian). It is unclear whether the "Johann" mentioned in verse three refers to the Johann Dethardt, the first ship to bring settlers into the area, or Johann Swartz, the owner/builder of the first home erected in what would become Indianola.

Education 
What is now Indianola is served by the Calhoun County Independent School District.

See also 

 Great Comanche Raid of 1840
 United States Camel Corps

Further reading 
 
 
  A description of the 1875 hurricane that destroyed Indianola

Notes

References

External links 

 
 
 News accounts of 1875 storm at GenDisasters site
 Indianola Immigrant Database Project at Victoria Regional History Center site
 Indianola history at Indianola, Texas site

Former cities in Texas
Populated places in Calhoun County, Texas
German-American culture in Texas
Ghost towns in South Texas
Destroyed cities
Recorded Texas Historic Landmarks
Victoria, Texas metropolitan area
1846 establishments in Texas
Populated places established in 1846